Hall v Hebert is a leading tort law case decided by the Supreme Court of Canada on the defences of contributory negligence and ex turpi causa non oritur actio (that a plaintiff cannot recover for illegal actions). 

The Court held that illegality can only act as a defence where the plaintiff is seeking to profit from illegal conduct or where a tort action is being used to circumvent or negate a criminal penalty.

Background
The defendant, Jean Hebert, owned a 1968 Pontiac Firebird,  and had been drinking with the plaintiff, Vincent Hall. They were out driving when the car stalled on a rough gravel road near steep drop-off. 

The plaintiff, originally the passenger, asked if he could drive in an attempt to roll start the car. The defendant agreed, aware that he had consumed 11 or 12 bottles of beer that evening. The plaintiff lost control of the car, which left the road down the steep slope and flipped over. The plaintiff suffered severe head injuries as a result.

At trial the judge found the defendant liable for negligence but apportioned liability at 75 percent to the defendant and 25 percent to the plaintiff. The central issue on appeal was whether the doctrine ex turpi causa non oritur actio provided a complete defence.

Opinion of the Court
The majority of the Court held that illegal conduct can bar recovery in tort only limited circumstances. The defence only operated when the integrity of the legal system is threatened by the claim, such as in situations where the plaintiff is attempting to profit from his illegal conduct, or when a tort claim is used to circumvent, subvert, or negate a criminal penalty.

Further, the doctrine of ex turpi causa can only be used as a defence and cannot be used to negate a duty of care, because it would inappropriately place an onus on the plaintiff to show absence of illegal or immoral conduct; the duty of care cannot be selectively applied to heads of damage; and the consideration of illegal or immoral conduct in duty of care would raise procedural problems where there are concurrent claims.

In the result, the plaintiff in this case was not seeking to profit from his illegal conduct (drinking and driving), nor was he circumventing the criminal law. However, he was contributorily negligent - therefore the damages were reduced to 50 percent.

Aftermath
Following this decision, the doctrine of ex turpi causa had a very limited application, and some commentators noted that the decision "for all practical purposes, makes the defence of illegality inapplicable to negligence actions."

The Supreme Court revisited the doctrine in British Columbia v. Zastowny, where they applied the decision in Hall to hold that a person is not entitled to compensation for unemployment during a prison sentence, except in circumstances such as a wrongful conviction. This followed from the rationale that such compensation would create a clash between the criminal justice system and civil law, which would compromise the integrity of the legal system.

References

External links
 

Canadian tort case law
Supreme Court of Canada cases
1993 in Canadian case law